Power boating describes activities performed in a motorized boat. Generally, a power boat has a high power-to-weight ratio and a hull design that allows for easy planing, which allows for higher speed and improved handling. Also, the shape of the actual boat is usually very streamlined, which minimizes air resistance and drag, therefore increasing speed. Power boats are used in yachting, waterskiing and wakeboarding.

Powerboating is generally considered to have begun in 1863 when Frenchman Jean Lenoir used a petrol engine in the small boat. The first major race took place in 1903 across the English Channel and the sport appeared as an event in the 1908 Olympics.

Currently, P1 SuperStock is considered the most prestigious powerboat racing championship in the world.

Motorboat racing
Boating
Boat races